Aphaneramma is an extinct genus of marine temnospondyl amphibian. It lived during the Early Triassic epoch. Fossils have been found in the Mianwali Formation of Pakistan, Madagascar,  the Zhitkov Formation of Russia, and the Kongressfjellet Formation of Svalbard (Norway). 

Aphaneramma's jaws were very long, similar to the gharial's, and lined with small teeth. This adaptation suggests it may have preyed on fish. A marine lifestyle for this animal was proposed. Aphaneramma is closely related to Cosgriffius from North America.

References 

Lonchorhynchines
Triassic temnospondyls of Europe
Triassic amphibians of Europe
Triassic temnospondyls of Asia
Triassic amphibians of Asia
Induan life
Fossils of Norway
Fossils of Russia
Fossils of Pakistan
Fossil taxa described in 1904